Kersley may refer to:

People
George Kersley, Sr., a Western Australian pioneer
Jean-Kersley Gardenne, a retired Mauritian pole vaulter
Kersley Appou, a football player
Kersley Levrai, a football player
Leo Kersley, a British dancer and teacher
Tom Kersley, an English cricketer

Fictional Characters
Mr. Kersley, a minor character from the book Mona the Vampire

Places
Kearsley (archaically known as Kersley), a town in Greater Manchester, England
Kersley, British Columbia, a small Canadian rural community
Kersley Elementary School, an elementary school in British Columbia

Other
Clifton and Kersley Coal Company, a historic coal mining company